The 2012 Ironman World Championship was a long distance triathlon competition held on October 13, 2012 in Kailua-Kona, Hawaii. The championship won by Pete Jacobs of Australia and Leanda Cave of England. It was the 36th such Ironman Triathlon World Championship, which has been held annually in Hawaii since 1978, with an additional race in 1982. The championship is organized by the World Triathlon Corporation (WTC).

Championship results

Men

Women

Qualification
For entry into the 2012 World Championship race, amateur athletes were required to qualify through a performance at an Ironman or selected Ironman 70.3 race. Entry into the championship race could also be obtained through a random allocation lottery or through the Ironman’s charitable eBay auction. The division of athletes was divided into professional, age group, physically challenged, and hand cycle divisions. 

For professional triathletes, the 2012 championship season marked the second year of a point system that determined which professional triathletes would qualify for the championship race. To qualify, points were earned by competing in WTC sanctioned Ironman and Ironman 70.3 events throughout the qualifying year. For the 2012 championship race that period was September 1, 2011 to August 31, 2012. The top 50 male and top 30 female pros in points at the end of the qualifying year qualified to race in Kona. An athlete's five highest scoring races were counted in the point totals. At least one Ironman race must have been completed and only three Ironman 70.3 races could count towards an athlete's overall point total. Prior champions receive an automatic entry for the Championship race for a period of five years after their last championship performance provided that they competed in at least one full-distance Ironman race during the qualifying year. Their entry does not count toward the number of available qualifying spots.

The Ironman 2012 series consisted of 28 Ironman races plus the 2011 Ironman World Championship which was itself a qualifier for the 2012 Championship.

Qualifying Ironmans

2012 Ironman Series results

Men

* Event shortened to 70.3 distance.

Women

* Event shortened to 70.3 distance.

References

External links
Ironman website
Professional Triathlete Qualifying Rules

Ironman World Championship
Ironman
Sports competitions in Hawaii
2012 in sports in Hawaii
Triathlon competitions in the United States